Nitromifene (also as the citrate salt nitromifene citrate, developmental code names CI-628, CN-5518, CN-55945) is a nonsteroidal selective estrogen receptor modulator (SERM) related to triphenylethylenes like tamoxifen that was never marketed. It is a mixture of (E)- and (Z)-isomers that possess similar antiestrogenic activity. The drug was described in 1966. Along with tamoxifen, nafoxidine, and clomifene, it was one of the earliest SERMs.

Nitromifene has been found to dissociate from the estrogen receptor 250-fold faster than estradiol. This may be involved in its antagonistic activity at the estrogen receptor.

References

Abandoned drugs
Nitro compounds
Pyrrolidines
Selective estrogen receptor modulators